The 123rd Regiment Illinois Volunteer Infantry, was an infantry and mounted infantry regiment that served in the Union Army during the American Civil War. In 1863 and 1864 it was temporarily known as the 123rd Illinois Volunteer Mounted Infantry Regiment, as part of Wilder's Lightning Brigade.

Service 
This regiment was organized at Camp Terry, Mattoon, Coles County, Illinois, by Colonel James Monroe, who at the time was major of the 7th Illinois Infantry. Companies A, C, D, H, I and K were from Coles County; B from Cumberland; E from Clark; F and G from Clark and Crawford. As a colonel in 1861, Ulysses S. Grant organized his first command, the 21st Illinois Volunteer Infantry Regiment, in Mattoon.

Initial infantry service 

It was mustered into service on September 6, 1862, with James Monroe as Colonel, Jonathan Biggs, of Westfield, Clark County, as Lieutenant Colonel, and James A. Connolly, of Charleston, Illinois, as Major. On 19 September 1862, the Regiment was loaded into freight cars at Mattoon, and transported to Louisville, Kentucky, where it was at once put to work, under Major General William "Bull" Nelson, to fortify the city against Confederate General Braxton Bragg, who was then advancing on it in pursuit of Union General Don Carlos Buell.

On October 1, having been assigned to the Thirty-third Brigade (General William R. Terrill), Fourth Division (General James S. Jackson), in McCook's Corps, the regiment started on the march under Buell, southward through Kentucky, after Bragg, who had turned back, and up to this time the regiment never had battalion drill, and hardly an attempt at company drill, as all the officers, except the colonel, were "raw recruits".

Just 19 days after leaving Mattoon, the regiment engaged in the Battle of Perryville, where 36 men were killed in action and 180 wounded. Generals Terrill and Jackson were both killed immediately behind and within twenty feet of the line of the regiment. Among the wounded were Captain Coblentz of Company E, First Lieutenant S. M. Shepard of Company A and Adjutant Leander H. Hamlin. Following the devastating bloodshed the 123rd was assigned to protect the railroad bridge across the Green River at Munfordville, Kentucky, in November and December 1862. It has become known as the "Battle for the Bridge," which began when the Union garrison led by John T. Wilder, prior to his assuming command of the 123rd, surrendered during the Battle of Munfordville.

The 123rd was initially assigned to the Army of the Ohio from September 1862 to November 1862, and then to the Army of the Cumberland from November 1862 to June 1865. The commanding general of the Army of the Cumberland was William Rosecrans. The regiment was in the 1st Brigade with Colonel Albert S. Hall, which was part of the 5th Division commanded by Brigadier General Joseph J. Reynolds, reporting to Major General George Henry Thomas.

Conversion to mounted infantry 

In February and March 1863, it was converted to mounted infantry. The 123rd Illinois' brigade became known as "Wilder's Lightning Brigade" commanded by Wilder. The brigade remained the 1st Brigade of the 5th Division, XIV Army Corps after its conversion. During this conversion, Spencer repeating rifles, invented by Christopher Spencer, were adopted as the command's primary weapon.

The new increase in firepower that the Spencer gave, allowed the 123rd and its brigade mates to see off numerically superior Confederate infantry and cavalry in several engagements. The weapon was estimated to allow the regiment to deliver five to seven times the firepower of muzzle-loading opponents.

Tullahoma campaign 

The 123rd first used its new rifles in the Battle of Hoover's Gap. The brigade showed the advantage of their speed despite the weather by reaching the gap nearly 9 miles ahead of Thomas's main body. Despite orders from the divisional commander, General Joseph J. Reynolds to fall back to his infantry, which was still six miles away, Wilder decided to take and hold the position.

The brigade surprised Confederate Colonel J. Russell Butler's 1st (3rd) Kentucky Cavalry Regiment at the entrance of the gap. After driving them through the gap, the brigade found it outnumbered four-to-one. The brigade entrenched and held this position.  The brigade, supported by Brig. Gen. Bushrod Johnson's brigade and some artillery, assaulted Wilder's position, but was driven back by the concentrated fire of the Spencers, losing 146 killed and wounded (almost a quarter of his force) to Wilder's 61. Colonel James Connolly, commander of the 123rd Illinois, wrote:

Chickamauga campaign 

During the calamitous Chickamauga Campaign|Tullahoma Campaign, the 123rd and the rest of the Lightning Brigade, were one of the few positive results. The 123rd was sent to defend Alexander's Bridge over the Chickamauga on 17 September. The next day, 18 September, the Lightning Brigade blocked the crossing against the approach of W.H.T. Walker's Corps. Feeling quite confident in the advantage their Spencer repeating rifles gave them, the brigade held off a brigade of Brig. Gen. St. John Liddell's division, which suffered 105 casualties against Wilder's superior firepower.

At around 14:00 on 19 September, the 123rd and its brigade spoiled the left column of the main rebel attack by severely mauling both Brig. Gen. John Gregg's brigade and Brig. Gen. Evander McNair's brigade. The attacking Confederates were surprised by the resolute, confident manner that the Lightning Brigade demonstrated in driving them back.

Post Chickamauga 

During the Siege of Chattanooga, the Lightning Brigade disbanded, and four of its regiments shifted to the Cavalry Corps where they served for the remainder of the war. The 123rd and the 72nd Indiana were sent to the 3rd Brigade of the 2nd Division.

During the Battle of Selma, First Lieutenant O. J. McManus, Sergeants J. S. Mullen and Henry E. Cross, Corporal McMurry and Privates Daniel Cook, John Bowman, Marion White and Henry Woodruff were killed, with 50 wounded, including Lieutenant Colonel Biggs, Adjutant L. B. Bane, Captains W. E. Adams and Owen Wiley, Lieutenants Alex. McNutt and J. R. Harding.

Late in the war, the regiment pursued Confederate General John Bell Hood. The unit was instrumental in the capture of former Confederate capital Montgomery, Alabama.

In June 1865 new recruits and some veterans were transferred to the 61st Regiment as the 123rd prepared to disband. Those who remained were mustered out June 27, 1865, by Captain L. M. Hosea and formally discharged at Springfield, Illinois, on July 11, 1865.

Total strength and casualties 
The regiment lost during service three officers and 82 enlisted men killed and mortally wounded and one officer and 133 enlisted men by disease for a total of 219.

Commanders 
Colonel James Monroe: September 6, 1862 – October 7, 1863 (killed at the Battle of Farmington)
Brigadier General of Volunteers James S. Jackson: October 1, 1862 – October 8, 1862 (killed at the Battle of Perryville)
Brigadier General of Volunteers William R. Terrill: September 9, 1862 – October 8, 1862 (killed at the Battle of Perryville)
Lt. Colonel James A. Connolly
Captain Oscar R. Bane
Colonel John T. Wilder: May 6, 1863 – November 1864 (resignation)
Brigadier General Kenner Garrard: May 20, 1864 – October 28, 1864
Major General James H. Wilson: October 28, 1864 – June 27, 1865

Officers 
 Surgeon John Milton Phipps, July 2, 1863 – March 30, 1864.
 Sergeant John Hamilton Morgan

See also 

 List of Illinois Civil War Units
 Illinois in the American Civil War

Notes

Bibliography

External links 
 Wilder's Brigade Mounted Infantry Living History Society (Archived 2009-10-19)
 The First Battle of Selma 
 Sherman's Fifth Corps

Units and formations of the Union Army from Illinois
Military units and formations established in 1862
Military units and formations disestablished in 1865
1862 establishments in Illinois